Eusociality (from Greek εὖ eu "good" and social), the highest level of organization of sociality, is defined by the following characteristics: cooperative brood care (including care of offspring from other individuals), overlapping generations within a colony of adults, and a division of labor into reproductive and non-reproductive groups. The division of labor creates specialized behavioral groups within an animal society which are sometimes referred to as 'castes'. Eusociality is distinguished from all other social systems because individuals of at least one caste usually lose the ability to perform at least one behavior characteristic of individuals in another caste. Eusocial colonies can be viewed as superorganisms.

Eusociality exists in certain insects, crustaceans, and mammals. It is mostly observed and studied in the Hymenoptera (ants, bees, and wasps) and in Blattodea (termites). A colony has caste differences: queens and reproductive males take the roles of the sole reproducers, while soldiers and workers work together to create a living situation favorable for the brood. In addition to Hymenoptera and Blattodea, there are two known eusocial vertebrates among rodents: the naked mole-rat and the Damaraland mole-rat. Some shrimp, such as Synalpheus regalis, are also eusocial. E. O. Wilson and others have claimed that humans have evolved a weak form of eusociality, but these arguments have been disputed.

History 
The term "eusocial" was introduced in 1966 by Suzanne Batra, who used it to describe nesting behavior in Halictine bees. Batra observed the cooperative behavior of the bees, males and females alike, as they took responsibility for at least one duty (i.e., burrowing, cell construction, oviposition) within the colony. The cooperativeness was essential as the activity of one labor division greatly influenced the activity of another. Eusocial colonies can be viewed as superorganisms, with individual castes being analogous to different tissue or cell types in a multicellular organism; castes fulfill a specific role that contributes to the functioning and survival of the whole colony, while also being incapable of independent survival outside the colony. 

For example, the size of pollen balls, a source of food, depended on when the egg-laying females oviposited. If the provisioning by pollen collectors was incomplete by the time the egg-laying female occupied a cell and oviposited, the size of the pollen balls would be small, leading to small offspring. Batra applied this term to species in which a colony is started by a single individual. Batra described other species, wherein the founder is accompanied by numerous helpers—as in a swarm of bees or ants—as "hypersocial".

In 1969, Charles D. Michener further expanded Batra's classification with his comparative study of social behavior in bees. He observed multiple species of bees (Apoidea) in order to investigate the different levels of animal sociality, all of which are different stages that a colony may pass through. Eusociality, which is the highest level of animal sociality a species can attain, specifically had three characteristics that distinguished it from the other levels:

 Egg-layers and worker-like individuals among adult females (division of labor)
 The overlap of generations (mother and adult offspring)
 Cooperative work on the cells of the bees' honeycomb

E. O. Wilson then extended the terminology to include other social insects, such as ants, wasps, and termites. Originally, it was defined to include organisms (only invertebrates) that had the following three features:

 Reproductive division of labor (with or without sterile castes)
 Overlapping generations
 Cooperative care of young

As eusociality became a recognized widespread phenomenon, however, it was also discovered in a group of chordates, the mole-rats. Further research also distinguished another possibly important criterion for eusociality known as "the point of no return". This is characterized by eusocial individuals that become fixed into one behavioral group, which usually occurs before reproductive maturity. This prevents them from transitioning between behavioral groups and creates an animal society that is truly dependent on each other for survival and reproductive success. For many insects, this irreversibility has changed the anatomy of the worker caste, which is sterile and provides support for the reproductive caste.

Taxonomic range 
Most eusocial societies exist in arthropods, while a few are found in mammals. Ferns may exhibit eusocial behavior amongst clones.

In insects 

Eusociality has evolved multiple times in different insect orders. In certain cases, eusociality has been reversed back into solitary behavior. The order Hymenoptera contains the largest group of eusocial insects, including ants, bees, and waspsthose with reproductive "queens" and more or less sterile "workers" and/or "soldiers" that perform specialized tasks. For example, in the well-studied social wasp Polistes versicolor, dominant females perform tasks such as building new cells and ovipositing, while subordinate females tend to perform tasks like feeding the larvae and foraging. The task differentiation between castes can be seen in the fact that subordinates complete 81.4% of the total foraging activity, while dominants only complete 18.6% of the total foraging. Eusocial species with a sterile caste are sometimes called hypersocial.

While only a moderate percentage of species in bees (families Apidae and Halictidae) and wasps (Crabronidae and Vespidae) are eusocial, nearly all species of ants (Formicidae) are eusocial. Some major lineages of wasps are mostly or entirely eusocial, including the subfamilies Polistinae and Vespinae. The corbiculate bees (subfamily Apinae of family Apidae) contain four tribes of varying degrees of sociality: the highly eusocial Apini (honey bees) and Meliponini (stingless bees), primitively eusocial Bombini (bumble bees), and the mostly solitary or weakly social Euglossini (orchid bees). Eusociality in these families is sometimes managed by a set of pheromones that alter the behavior of specific castes in the colony. These pheromones may act across different species, as observed in Apis andreniformis (black dwarf honey bee), where worker bees responded to queen pheromone from the related Apis florea (red dwarf honey bee). Pheromones are sometimes used in these castes to assist with foraging. Workers of the Australian stingless bee Tetragonula carbonaria, for instance, mark food sources with a pheromone, helping their nest mates to find the food.

Reproductive specialization generally involves the production of sterile members of the species, which carry out specialized tasks to care for the reproductive members. It can manifest in the appearance of individuals within a group whose behavior or morphology is modified for group defense, including self-sacrificing behavior ("altruism"). An example of a species whose sterile caste displays this altruistic behavior is Myrmecocystus mexicanus, one of the species of honey ant. Select sterile workers fill their abdomens with liquid food until they become immobile and hang from the ceilings of the underground nests, acting as food storage for the rest of the colony. Not all social species of insects have distinct morphological differences between castes. For example, in the Neotropical social wasp Synoeca surinama, social displays determine the caste ranks of individuals in the developing brood. These castes are sometimes further specialized in their behavior based on age. For example, Scaptotrigona postica workers assume different roles in the nest based on their age. Between approximately 0–40 days old, the workers perform tasks within the nest such as provisioning cell broods, colony cleaning, and nectar reception and dehydration. Once older than 40 days, Scaptotrigona postica workers move outside of the nest to practice colony defense and foraging.

In Lasioglossum aeneiventre, a halictid bee from Central America, nests may be headed by more than one female; such nests have more cells, and the number of active cells per female is correlated with the number of females in the nest, implying that having more females leads to more efficient building and provisioning of cells. In similar species with only one queen, such as Lasioglossum malachurum in Europe, the degree of eusociality depends on the clime in which the species is found.

Termites (order Blattodea, infraorder Isoptera) make up another large portion of highly advanced eusocial animals. The colony is differentiated into various castes: the queen and king are the sole reproducing individuals; workers forage and maintain food and resources; and soldiers defend the colony against ant attacks. The latter two castes, which are sterile and perform highly specialized, complex social behaviors, are derived from different stages of pluripotent larvae produced by the reproductive caste. Some soldiers have jaws so enlarged (specialized for defense and attack) that they are unable to feed themselves and must be fed by workers.

Austroplatypus incompertus is a species of ambrosia beetle native to Australia, and is the first beetle (order Coleoptera) to be recognized as eusocial. This species forms colonies in which a single female is fertilized, and is protected by many unfertilized females, which also serve as workers excavating tunnels in trees. This species also participates in cooperative brood care, in which individuals care for juveniles that are not their own.

Some species of gall-inducing insects, including the gall-forming aphid, Pemphigus spyrothecae (order Hemiptera), and thrips such as Kladothrips (order Thysanoptera), are also described as eusocial. These species have very high relatedness among individuals due to their partially asexual mode of reproduction (sterile soldier castes being clones of the reproducing female), but the gall-inhabiting behavior gives these species a defensible resource that sets them apart from related species with similar genetics. They produce soldier castes capable of fortress defense and protection of their colony against both predators and competitors. In these groups, therefore, high relatedness alone does not lead to the evolution of social behavior, but requires that groups occur in a restricted, shared area. These species have morphologically distinct soldier castes that defend against kleptoparasites (parasitism by theft) and are able to reproduce parthenogenetically (without fertilization).

In crustaceans 
Eusociality has also arisen in three different lineages among some crustaceans that live in separate colonies. Synalpheus regalis, Synalpheus filidigitus, Synalpheus elizabethae, Synalpheus chacei, Synalpheus riosi, Synalpheus duffyi, Synalpheus microneptunus, and Synalpheus cayoneptunus are the eight recorded species of parasitic shrimp that rely on fortress defense and live in groups of closely related individuals in tropical reefs and sponges, living eusocially with a typically a single breeding female and a large number of male defenders, armed with enlarged snapping claws. As with other eusocial societies, there is a single shared living space for the colony members, and the non-breeding members act to defend it.

The fortress defense hypothesis additionally points out that because sponges provide both food and shelter, there is an aggregation of relatives (because the shrimp do not have to disperse to find food), and much competition for those nesting sites. Being the target of attack promotes a good defense system (soldier caste); soldiers therefore promote the fitness of the whole nest by ensuring safety and reproduction of the queen.

Eusociality offers a competitive advantage in shrimp populations. Eusocial species were found to be more abundant, occupy more of the habitat, and use more of the available resources than non-eusocial species. Other studies add to these findings by pointing out that cohabitation was more rare than expected by chance, and that most sponges were dominated by one species, which was frequently eusocial.

In nonhuman mammals 

Among mammals, eusociality is known in two species in the Phiomorpha, the naked mole-rat (Heterocephalus glaber) and the Damaraland mole-rat (Fukomys damarensis), both of which are highly inbred. Usually living in harsh or limiting environments, these mole-rats aid in raising siblings and relatives born to a single reproductive queen. However, this classification is controversial owing to disputed definitions of 'eusociality'.
To avoid inbreeding, mole rats sometimes outbreed and establish new colonies when resources are sufficient. Most of the individuals cooperatively care for the brood of a single reproductive female (the queen) to which they are most likely related. Thus, it is uncertain whether mole rats classify as true eusocial organisms, since their social behavior depends largely on their resources and environment.

Some mammals in the Carnivora and Primates exhibit eusocial tendencies, especially meerkats (Suricata suricatta) and dwarf mongooses (Helogale parvula). These show cooperative breeding and marked reproductive skews. In the dwarf mongoose, the breeding pair receives food priority and protection from subordinates and rarely has to defend against predators.

In humans 

An early 21st century debate focused on whether humans are prosocial or eusocial. Edward O. Wilson called humans eusocial apes, arguing for similarities to ants, and observing that early hominins cooperated to rear their children while other members of the same group hunted and foraged. Wilson argued that through cooperation and teamwork, ants and humans form superorganisms. Wilson's claims were vigorously rejected by critics of group selection theory, which grounded Wilson's argument, and also because human reproductive labor is not divided between castes.

Though controversial, it has been suggested that male homosexuality and/or female menopause could have evolved through kin selection, which, if true, would mean that humans sometimes exhibit a type of alloparental behavior known as "helpers at the nest", a social structure similar to eusociality in which juveniles and sexually mature adolescents remain in association with their parents and help them raise subsequent broods or litters, instead of dispersing and beginning to reproduce themselves. This type of co-operative breeding behavior is seen in several bird species, some non-eusocial bees, meerkats, and, potentially, humans. In such species, however, the reproductive parents and the subordinate helpers do not belong to different castes, as in eusocial species, and helpers will still try to reproduce on their own if given the opportunity. For example, meerkat matriarchs socially suppress the sexual activity of their daughters to ensure that their only means of gaining fitness is through helping to raise their siblings, but helpers will still try to reproduce on their own if given the chance. Some authors have argued that such "helper" behaviors and eusociality exist together on a continuum of similar social systems, while others draw a sharp distinction between the two.

Evolution

Phylogenetic distribution 

Eusociality is a rare but widespread phenomenon in species in at least seven orders in the animal kingdom, as shown in the phylogenetic tree (non-eusocial groups not shown). All species of termites are eusocial, and it is believed that they were the first eusocial animals to evolve, sometime in the upper Jurassic period (~150 million years ago). The other orders shown also contain non-eusocial species, including many lineages where eusociality was inferred to be the ancestral state. Thus the number of independent evolutions of eusociality is still under investigation. The major eusocial groups are shown in boldface in the phylogenetic tree.

Paradox 
Prior to the gene-centered view of evolution, eusociality was seen as an apparent evolutionary paradox: if adaptive evolution unfolds by differential reproduction of individual organisms, how can individuals incapable of passing on their genes evolve and persist? In On the Origin of Species, Darwin referred to the existence of sterile castes as the "one special difficulty, which at first appeared to me insuperable, and actually fatal to my theory". Darwin anticipated that a possible resolution to the paradox might lie in the close family relationship, which W.D. Hamilton quantified a century later with his 1964 inclusive fitness theory. After the gene-centered view of evolution was developed in the mid-1970s, non-reproductive individuals were seen as an extended phenotype of the genes, which are the primary beneficiaries of natural selection.

Inclusive fitness and haplodiploidy 

According to inclusive fitness theory, organisms can gain fitness not just through increasing their own reproductive output, but also via increasing the reproductive output of other individuals that share their genes, especially their close relatives. Individuals are selected to help their relatives when the cost of helping is less than the benefit gained by their relative multiplied by the fraction of genes that they share, i.e. when Cost < relatedness * Benefit. Under inclusive fitness theory, the necessary conditions for eusociality to evolve are more easily fulfilled by haplodiploid species because of their unusual relatedness structure.

In haplodiploid species, females develop from fertilized eggs and males develop from unfertilized eggs. Because a male is haploid, his daughters share 100% of his genes and 50% of their mother's. Therefore, they share 75% of their genes with each other. This mechanism of sex determination gives rise to what W. D. Hamilton first termed "supersisters" which are more related to their sisters than they would be to their own offspring. Even though workers often do not reproduce, they can potentially pass on more of their genes by helping to raise their sisters than they would by having their own offspring (each of which would only have 50% of their genes). This unusual situation, where females may have greater fitness when they help rear siblings rather than producing offspring, is often invoked to explain the multiple independent evolutions of eusociality (arising at least nine separate times) within the haplodiploid group Hymenoptera. While females share 75% of genes with their sisters in haplodiploid populations, they only share 25% of their genes with their brothers. Accordingly, the average relatedness of an individual to their sibling is 50%. Therefore, helping behavior is only advantageous if it is biased to helping sisters, which would drive the population to a 1:3 sex ratio of males to females. At this ratio, males, as the rarer sex, increase in reproductive value, negating the benefit of female-biased investment.

However, not all eusocial species are haplodiploid (termites, some snapping shrimps, and mole rats are not). Conversely, many bees are haplodiploid yet are not eusocial, and among eusocial species many queens mate with multiple males, resulting in a hive of half-sisters that share only 25% of their genes. The association between haplodiploidy and eusociality is below statistical significance. Haplodiploidy alone is thus neither necessary nor sufficient for eusociality to emerge. However relatedness does still play a part, as monogamy (queens mating singly) has been shown to be the ancestral state for all eusocial species so far investigated. If kin selection is an important force driving the evolution of eusociality, monogamy should be the ancestral state, because it maximizes the relatedness of colony members.

Ecology 

Many scientists citing the close phylogenetic relationships between eusocial and non-eusocial species are making the case that environmental factors are especially important in the evolution of eusociality. The relevant factors primarily involve the distribution of food and predators.

Increased parasitism and predation rates are the primary ecological drivers of social organization. Group living affords colony members defense against enemies, specifically predators, parasites, and competitors, and allows them to gain advantage from superior foraging methods.

With the exception of some aphids and thrips, all eusocial species live in a communal nest which provides both shelter and access to food resources. Mole rats, many bees, most termites, and most ants live in burrows in the soil; wasps, some bees, some ants, and some termites build above-ground nests or inhabit above-ground cavities; thrips and aphids inhabit galls (neoplastic outgrowths) induced on plants; ambrosia beetles and some termites nest together in dead wood; and snapping shrimp inhabit crevices in marine sponges. For many species the habitat outside the nest is often extremely arid or barren, creating such a high cost to dispersal that the chance to take over the colony following parental death is greater than the chance of dispersing to form a new colony. Defense of such fortresses from both predators and competitors often favors the evolution of non-reproductive soldier castes, while the high costs of nest construction and expansion favor non-reproductive worker castes.

The importance of ecology is supported by evidence such as experimentally induced reproductive division of labor, for example when normally solitary queens are forced together. Conversely, female Damaraland mole-rats undergo hormonal changes that promote dispersal after periods of high rainfall, supporting the plasticity of eusocial traits in response to environmental cues.

Climate also appears to be a selective agent driving social complexity; across bee lineages and Hymenoptera in general, higher forms of sociality are more likely to occur in tropical than temperate environments. Similarly, social transitions within halictid bees, where eusociality has been gained and lost multiple times, are correlated with periods of climatic warming. Social behavior in facultative social bees is often reliably predicted by ecological conditions, and switches in behavioral type have been experimentally induced by translocating offspring of solitary or social populations to warm and cool climates. In H. rubicundus, females produce a single brood in cooler regions and two or more broods in warmer regions, so the former populations are solitary while the latter are social. In another species of sweat bees, L. calceatum, social phenotype has been predicted by altitude and micro-habitat composition, with social nests found in warmer, sunnier sites, and solitary nests found in adjacent, cooler, shaded locations. Facultatively social bee species, however, which comprise the majority of social bee diversity, have their lowest diversity in the tropics, being largely limited to temperate regions.

Multilevel selection 

Once pre-adaptations such as group formation, nest building, high cost of dispersal, and morphological variation are present, between-group competition has been cited as a quintessential force in the transition to advanced eusociality. Because the hallmarks of eusociality will produce an extremely altruistic society, such groups will out-reproduce their less cooperative competitors, eventually eliminating all non-eusocial groups from a species. Multilevel selection has however been heavily criticized by some for its conflict with the kin selection theory.

Reversal to solitarity 
A reversal to solitarity is an evolutionary phenomenon in which descendants of a eusocial group evolve solitary behavior once again. Bees have been model organisms for the study of reversal to solitarity, because of the diversity of their social systems. Each of the four origins of eusociality in bees was followed by at least one reversal to solitarity, giving a total of at least nine reversals. In a few species, solitary and eusocial colonies appear simultaneously in the same population, and different populations of the same species may be fully solitary or eusocial. This suggests that eusociality is costly to maintain, and can only persist when ecological variables favor it. Disadvantages of eusociality include the cost of investing in non-reproductive offspring, and an increased risk of disease.

All reversals to solitarity have occurred among primitively eusocial groups; none have followed the emergence of advanced eusociality. The "point of no return" hypothesis posits that the morphological differentiation of reproductive and non-reproductive castes prevents highly eusocial species such as the honeybee from reverting to the solitary state.

Physiological and developmental mechanisms 
An understanding of the physiological causes and consequences of the eusocial condition has been somewhat slow; nonetheless, major advancements have been made in learning more about the mechanistic and developmental processes that lead to eusociality.

Involvement of pheromones 
Pheromones are thought to play an important role in the physiological mechanisms underlying the development and maintenance of eusociality. In fact the evolution of enzymes involved both in the production and perception of pheromones has been shown to be important for the emergence of eusociality both within termites and in Hymenoptera. The most well-studied queen pheromone system in social insects is that of the honey bee Apis mellifera. Queen mandibular glands were found to produce a mixture of five compounds, three aliphatic and two aromatic, which have been found to control workers. Mandibular gland extracts inhibit workers from constructing queen cells in which new queens are reared which can delay the hormonally based behavioral development of workers and can suppress ovarian development in workers. Both behavioral effects mediated by the nervous system often leading to recognition of queens (releaser) and physiological effects on the reproductive and endocrine system (primer) are attributed to the same pheromones. These pheromones volatilize or are deactivated within thirty minutes, allowing workers to respond rapidly to the loss of their queen.

The levels of two of the aliphatic compounds increase rapidly in virgin queens within the first week after eclosion (emergence from the pupal case), which is consistent with their roles as sex attractants during the mating flight. It is only after a queen is mated and begins laying eggs, however, that the full blend of compounds is made. The physiological factors regulating reproductive development and pheromone production are unknown.

In several ant species, reproductive activity has also been associated with pheromone production by queens. In general, mated egg laying queens are attractive to workers whereas young winged virgin queens, which are not yet mated, elicit little or no response. However, very little is known about when pheromone production begins during the initiation of reproductive activity or about the physiological factors regulating either reproductive development or queen pheromone production in ants.

Among ants, the queen pheromone system of the fire ant Solenopsis invicta is particularly well studied. Both releaser and primer pheromones have been demonstrated in this species. A queen recognition (releaser) hormone is stored in the poison sac along with three other compounds. These compounds were reported to elicit a behavioral response from workers. Several primer effects have also been demonstrated. Pheromones initiate reproductive development in new winged females, called female sexuals. These chemicals also inhibit workers from rearing male and female sexuals, suppress egg production in other queens of multiple queen colonies and cause workers to execute excess queens. The action of these pheromones together maintains the eusocial phenotype which includes one queen supported by sterile workers and sexually active males (drones). In queenless colonies that lack such pheromones, winged females will quickly shed their wings, develop ovaries and lay eggs. These virgin replacement queens assume the role of the queen and even start to produce queen pheromones. There is also evidence that queen weaver ants Oecophylla longinoda have a variety of exocrine glands that produce pheromones, which prevent workers from laying reproductive eggs.

Similar mechanisms are used for the eusocial wasp species Vespula vulgaris. In order for a Vespula vulgaris queen to dominate all the workers, usually numbering more than 3000 in a colony, she exerts pheromone to signal her dominance. The workers were discovered to regularly lick the queen while feeding her, and the air-borne pheromone from the queen's body alerts those workers of her dominance.

The mode of action of inhibitory pheromones which prevent the development of eggs in workers has been convincingly demonstrated in the bumble bee Bombus terrestris. In this species, pheromones suppress activity of the corpora allata and juvenile hormone (JH) secretion. The corpora allata is an endocrine gland that produces JH, a group of hormones that regulate many aspects of insect physiology. With low JH, eggs do not mature. Similar inhibitory effects of lowering JH were seen in halictine bees and polistine wasps, but not in honey bees.

Other strategies 
A variety of strategies in addition to the use of pheromones have evolved that give the queens of different species of social insects a measure of reproductive control over their nest mates. In many Polistes wasp colonies, monogamy is established soon after colony formation by physical dominance interactions among foundresses of the colony including biting, chasing, and food soliciting. Such interactions created a dominance hierarchy headed by individuals with the greatest ovarian development. Larger, older individuals often have an advantage during the establishment of dominance hierarchies. The rank of subordinates is positively correlated with the degree of ovarian development and the highest ranking individual usually becomes queen if the established queen disappears. Workers do not oviposit when queens are present because of a variety of reasons: colonies tend to be small enough that queens can effectively dominate workers, queens practice selective oophagy or egg eating, or the flow of nutrients favors queen over workers and queens rapidly lay eggs in new or vacated cells. However, it is also possible that morphological differences favor the worker. In certain species of wasps, such as Apoica flavissima queens are smaller than their worker counterparts. This can lead to interesting worker-queen dynamics, often with the worker policing queen behaviors. Other wasps, like Polistes instabilis have workers with the potential to develop into reproductives, but only in cases where there are no queens to suppress them.

In primitively eusocial bees (where castes are morphologically similar and colonies usually small and short-lived), queens frequently nudge their nest mates and then burrow back down into the nest. This behavior draws workers into the lower part of the nest where they may respond to stimuli for cell construction and maintenance. Being nudged by the queen may play a role in inhibiting ovarian development and this form of queen control is supplemented by oophagy of worker laid eggs. Furthermore, temporally discrete production of workers and gynes (actual or potential queens) can cause size dimorphisms between different castes as size is strongly influenced by the season during which the individual is reared. In many wasp species worker caste determination is characterized by a temporal pattern in which workers precede non-workers of the same generation. In some cases, for example in the bumble bee, queen control weakens late in the season and the ovaries of workers develop to an increasing extent. The queen attempts to maintain her dominance by aggressive behavior and by eating worker laid eggs; her aggression is often directed towards the worker with the greatest ovarian development.

In highly eusocial wasps (where castes are morphologically dissimilar), both the quantity and quality of food seem to be important for caste differentiation. Recent studies in wasps suggest that differential larval nourishment may be the environmental trigger for larval divergence into one of two developmental classes destined to become either a worker or a gyne. All honey bee larvae are initially fed with royal jelly, which is secreted by workers, but normally they are switched over to a diet of pollen and honey as they mature; if their diet is exclusively royal jelly, however, they grow larger than normal and differentiate into queens. This jelly seems to contain a specific protein, designated as royalactin, which increases body size, promotes ovary development, and shortens the developmental time period. Furthermore, the differential expression in Polistes of larval genes and proteins (also differentially expressed during queen versus caste development in honey bees) indicate that regulatory mechanisms may occur very early in development.

See also 

 Dense heterarchy
 Evolutionarily stable strategy
 International Union for the Study of Social Insects
 Patterns of self-organization in ants
 Reciprocity (social psychology)
 Stigmergy
 Ant colony optimization (ACO)
 Bee colony optimization
 Task allocation and partitioning of social insects

References

External links 
 International Union for the Study of Social Insects
 Eusociality in naked mole-rats

Behavioral ecology
Superorganisms
Sociobiology